The Asiatic brush-tailed porcupine (Atherurus macrourus) is a species of rodent in the family Hystricidae. It is found in China, Bhutan,  India, Laos, Malaysia, Myanmar, Thailand, and Vietnam.

Taxonomy
The synonyms of this species are Atherurus assamensis (Thomas, 1921), and Atherurus macrourus (Thomas, 1921) subspecies assamensis.

Habitat
It is a nocturnal and fossorial species, occurring in subtropical and tropical montane forests. It is found on the forest floor, often in areas with profuse undergrowth interspersed with cane and bamboo brakes and palms.

Breeding
It constructs burrows, which may be occupied by up to three animals. The female produces one or two litters a year, of a single young, after a gestation period of 100 to 110 days.

Conservation
Known to be one of the rarest porcupines in South Asia, the species is protected under Schedule II of the Indian Wildlife (Protection) Act, though not listed in CITES. It has been recorded from Namdapha National Park in Arunachal Pradesh, India (Molur et al. 2005). It is present in a number of protected areas in Southeast Asia.

Behavior
In one study using camera traps, it was found that the porcupine typically hunts at night, with a single activity peak during the three-hour period before midnight. To avoid predators on nights when the moon is full, foraging activity is limited to dawn and dusk.

References

Woods, C. A. and C. W. Kilpatrick. (2005). Hystricognathi. Pp 1538–1600 in Mammal Species of the World a Taxonomic and Geographic Reference 3rd ed. D. E. Wilson and D. M. Reeder eds. Smithsonian Institution Press, Washington D.C.

Atherurus
Rodents of India
Mammals described in 1758
Rodents of China
Rodents of Laos
Rodents of Malaysia
Rodents of Myanmar
Rodents of Thailand
Rodents of Vietnam
Taxonomy articles created by Polbot
Taxa named by Carl Linnaeus